Bonfield may refer to:

Bonfield, Illinois
Bonfield, Ontario

Bonfield (surname)